is an annual Japanese professional wrestling event promoted by DDT Pro-Wrestling (DDT). The event has been held since 2009 and aired domestically on Fighting TV Samurai and later as an internet pay-per-view (iPPV) on DDT's streaming service Wrestle Universe. Since 2019, the event has aired on AbemaTV. The event is usually held in summer and is DDT's biggest event of the year. Though DDT produced an event titled "Go! Go! Neverland! Peter Pan Summer Vacation" on August 15, 2004, it is not considered a part of the Peter Pan event series.

Events

Notes

References

External links
The official DDT Pro-Wrestling website
Peter Pan at ProWrestlingHistory.com

 
DDT Pro-Wrestling shows